Collarenebri is a town in north western New South Wales, Australia. Collarenebri is one of three towns ending in 'BRI' in Northern New South Wales.

In the 2016 census, Collarenebri had a population of 650.

Collarenebri is an indigenous word of the Gamilaraay galariinbaraay, meaning 'place of flowers' or 'eucalyptus blossoms'.

History
Yuwaalaraay (also known as Yuwalyai, Euahlayi, Yuwaaliyaay, Gamilaraay, Kamilaroi, Yuwaaliyaayi) is an Australian Aboriginal language spoken on Yuwaalaraay country. The Yuwaalaraay language region includes the landscape within the local government boundaries of the Shire of Balonne, including the town of Dirranbandi as well as the border town of Hebel extending to Walgett and Collarenebri in New South Wales.

Yuwaalayaay (also known as Yuwalyai, Euahlayi, Yuwaaliyaay, Gamilaraay, Kamilaroi, Yuwaaliyaayi) is an Australian Aboriginal language spoken on Yuwaalayaay country. It is closely related to the Gamilaraay and Yuwaalaraay languages. The Yuwaalayaay language region includes the landscape within the local government boundaries of the Shire of Balonne, including the town of Dirranbandi as well as the border town of Goodooga extending to Walgett and the Narran Lakes in New South Wales.

Originally spelt "Collarindabri", Collarenebri is located near a shallow rocky ford on the Barwon River, which provided a hard bottomed shallow river crossing for stock and pioneering travellers.

The Gamilaroi Nation of Indigenous Australians resided in this region prior to white settlement.

In 1860 William Earl settled near the Collarenebri crossing and established "The Squatters Arms" to capitalise on the increasing traffic through the area. Earl and his pub later became famous for having been held up by bushranger Captain Thunderbolt. Earl is credited with having established present day Collarenebri, with a prominent street and aged housing carrying his name. A number of his descendants still reside in the town.

By the end of 1865, Collarenebri is described as having "two stores, a public house, with another nearly finished: the timber is also lying at Collarenebri for a Government punt; several small houses and a population of about 50 people stationary."

The town of Collarenebri was later gazetted on 12 July 1867. By 1890 Collarenebri had become a growing town with a hospital, police station, school and a number of businesses. The cemetery at Collarenebri dates back to 1906.

Collarenebri has long been recorded as a significant site for Aboriginal people living in the area. There are many artifacts and significant sites along the Barwon River. On Collymongle Station there are some very old aboriginal carved trees. There is a well maintained Aboriginal cemetery just outside the town which is unique to the area, with graves covered in crushed and melted glass and decorated with items that represent that person. Collarenebri continues to be a significant community for Aboriginal people.

Collarenebri was among the last places in Australia to be converted from a manual switchboard to an automatic telephone exchange (in 1986). Volunteers run Collarenebri's live, local radio station YAAMA-FM 95.9 specialising in indigenous programming.

Industries in the area include cotton and wheat farming, sheep and beef cattle breeding. Other activities include fossicking for gemstones such as topaz, agate and petrified wood.

The Barwon River area is regarded as one of the best inland fishing locations in Australia.

Sport
Collarenebri has a rugby league team, the Collarenebri Bulldogs, who compete in the Barwon Darling Rugby League competition.

Heritage listings 
Collarenebri has a number of heritage-listed sites, including:
 Gundabloui Road: Collarenebri Aboriginal Cemetery

Population
In the 2016 Census, there were 650 people in Collarenebri.
 Aboriginal and Torres Strait Islander people made up 42.1% of the population. 
 90.4% of people were born in Australia and 89.9% of people spoke only English at home. 
 The most common responses for religion were Anglican 31.1%, No Religion 26.3% and Catholic 17.3%.

References

Further reading

External links

Collarenebri – Walgett Shire Council

Towns in New South Wales
 
Walgett Shire